Pair or PAIR or Pairing may refer to:

Government and politics
 Pair (parliamentary convention), matching of members unable to attend, so as not to change the voting margin
 Pair, a member of the Prussian House of Lords
 Pair, the French equivalent of peer, holder of a French Pairie, a French high title roughly equivalent to a member of the British peerage

Mathematics
 2 (number), two of something, a pair
 2-tuple, in mathematics and set theory
 Ordered pair, in mathematics and set theory
 Pairing, in mathematics, an R-bilinear map of modules, where R is the underlying ring
 Pair type, in programming languages and type theory, a product type with two component types
 Topological pair, an inclusion of topological spaces

Science and technology
 Couple (app), formerly Pair, a mobile application for two people
 PAIR (puncture-aspiration-injection-reaspiration), in medicine
 Pairing, a handshaking process in Bluetooth communications
 Pair programming, an agile software development technique
 Pairing (computing), the linking together of devices to allow communications between them
 Twisted pair, a couple of electric wires twisted together
 Crew pairing, a sequence of activities a flight crew member is supposed to perform

Sports and games
 Pair, a team of two in pair skating
 Pair (cricket), a cricket term for being out for 0 in both innings of a match
 One pair (poker), a type of poker hand
Coxless pair or coxed pair, racing rowing shells

Other uses
 "A pair of" can refer to one unit of certain clothing or other items. For example, "a pair of jeans" refers to one garment. Other examples include shorts, underwear, glasses, headphones, scissors, pliers, tweezers, etc.
 Au pair, a work agreement
 Grow a pair, referring to testicles, a slang term meaning act with more courage 
 Patent Application Information Retrieval, an online service providing access to the prosecution histories of U.S. patents and patent applications
 Peer-Allocated Instant Response, for distance learning in the Netherlands
 Wine pairing, the process of pairing food dishes with wine to enhance the dining experience

See also

 Couple (disambiguation), various senses for two joined things
 Even (disambiguation) 
 Pear, a fruit
 Pare people, a Tanzanian ethnic group
 Paired test, a student's t-test in statistical hypothesis testing

2 (number)